The Lester B. Pearson School Board (LBPSB, CSLBP) is one of the largest school boards on the island of Montreal and one of the nine English school boards in the province of Quebec. It is headquartered in Dorval, Quebec.

Established in 1998, the LBPSB is responsible for English public schools from Verdun, through the West Island and Ile Perrot and "mainland" territories stretching west to the Ontario border. 
It is named after Lester B. Pearson, Canada's 14th Prime Minister.

 Michael Chechile is the Director General of the school board and the Chairman of the Board is Noel Burke.

The Lester B. Pearson School Board is the only school board in Canada to have an official consultative group of students to its Council.  The group, entitled the 'Central Students' Committee' (CSC for short) produces formal responses to the consultations proposed by the Council of Commissioners.

List of LBPSB Schools

This school board oversees 37 elementary schools, 13 secondary schools, 4 adult education centres and 6 vocational training centres, in which more than 20,000 students are enrolled.

Baie-d'Urfé

Elementary School:
 Dorset Elementary School

Beaconsfield

Vocational Education:
 Gordon Robertson Centre

Adult Education:
 Place Cartier Adult Centre

High school:
 Beaconsfield High School

Elementary School:
 Beacon Hill Elementary School 
 Christmas Park Elementary School 
 Sherbrooke Academy Sr. 
 St. Edmund Elementary School 
 Sherbrooke Academy Jr.

Dollard-des-Ormeaux
Elementary School:
 Springdale Elementary School 
 Sunshine Academy  
 Westpark Elementary School
 Wilder Penfield Elementary School

Dorval
Elementary School:
 Dorval Elementary School

Hudson

High school:
 Westwood High School - Senior Campus

Elementary School:
 Mount Pleasant Elementary School

Kirkland

Elementary School:
 Margaret Manson Elementary School

Lachine, Montreal

Vocational Education:
 Pearson Electrotechnology Centre

High school:
 Lakeside Academy

Elementary School:
 Maple Grove Elementary School

LaSalle, Montreal

Vocational Education:
 P.A.C.C Vocational Training

Adult Education:
 P.A.C.C. (Adult Education)

High schools:
 LaSalle Community Comprehensive High School

Elementary School:
 Children's World Academy 
 Allion Elementary School 
 St. Lawrence Academy (Junior)
 St. Lawrence Academy (Senior) 
 LaSalle Elementary School

Pierrefonds-Roxboro, Montreal

Vocational Education:
 West Island Career Centre

High schools:
 Pierrefonds Community High School

Elementary School:
 Beachwood Elementary School 
 Greendale Elementary School
 St. Anthony Elementary School 
 St. Charles Elementary School 
 Terry Fox Elementary School

Pincourt

Elementary School:
 Edgewater Elementary School 
 St. Patrick Elementary School

Pointe-Claire

High schools:
 Horizon High School 
 John Rennie High School 
 St. Thomas High School

Elementary School:
 Clearpoint Elementary School 
 St. John Fisher Elementary School (Junior)
 St. John Fisher Elementary School (Senior)

Saint-Télesphore
Elementary School:
 Soulanges Elementary School

Saint-Lazare

High schools:
 Westwood High School - Junior Campus

Elementary School:
 Evergreen Elementary School (Quebec) 
 Forest Hill Elementary School (Junior) 
 Forest Hill Elementary School (Senior) 
   Birchwood Elementary School

Sainte-Anne-de-Bellevue

High schools:
 Macdonald High School

Vaudreuil-Dorion

Elementary School:
 Pierre Elliott Trudeau Elementary School

Verdun, Montreal

High schools:
 Beurling Academy

Elementary Schools:
 Verdun Elementary School
 Angrignon Elementary School
 Riverview Elementary School (Verdun)

References

External links
 

 
Education in Montreal
School districts in Quebec
Education in Montérégie
Quebec English School Boards Association
Dorval